Deh-e Kabuter Pirzal (also Romanized as Deh-e Kabūter Pīrzāl) is a village in Dehdasht-e Sharqi Rural District, in the Central District of Kohgiluyeh County, Kohgiluyeh and Boyer-Ahmad Province, Iran. At the 2006 census, its population was 96, in 18 families.

References 

Populated places in Kohgiluyeh County